Aidan Charles Patrick Connolly (born 15 August 1995) is a Scottish professional footballer who plays as a winger for Raith Rovers in the Scottish Championship.

Connolly began his career with Queen's Park before joining Dundee United in 2013, and also played for Brechin City on loan. He was released by Dundee United in January 2016, joining Raith Rovers shortly after. He spent two seasons with York City from 2016 to 2018, and one year with Dunfermline Athletic. He has represented Scotland at under-16 and under-19 level.

Early life
Connolly was born in Dundee on 15 August 1995, when his father Paddy Connolly was playing for Dundee United. He attended Williamwood High School in Clarkston, East Renfrewshire.

Club career
Connolly started his career at Queen's Park, progressing through the club's youth system. He made his first-team debut in November 2012 whilst still at school. He was voted Scottish Football League Young Player of the Month for December 2012 after scoring three times since his first appearance.

Together with Queen's Park teammate Andrew Robertson, Connolly signed for Scottish Premiership club Dundee United in June 2013. He was sent out on a one-month loan to Brechin City in September 2013. After returning from Brechin, Connolly made his Dundee United debut as a late substitute in a 3–1 victory over Motherwell. At the start of the following season he signed a one-year contract extension to keep him at the club until 2016. Connolly made his first start and scored his first goal for Dundee United against Hibernian in the Scottish League Cup on 29 October 2014. Retaining his place in the next match against St Mirren, he contributed to all three of United's goals on his first Premiership start.

After making only one starting appearance during the 2015–16 season, Connolly was released from his Dundee United contract by mutual consent on 21 January 2016. The following day, he joined Scottish Championship club Raith Rovers on a contract until the end of 2015–16.

On 28 June 2016, Connolly joined newly relegated National League club York City on a two-year contract, having previously played under manager Jackie McNamara at Dundee United. On 21 May 2017, he came on as a 69th-minute substitute as York beat Macclesfield Town 3–2 at Wembley Stadium in the 2017 FA Trophy Final, scoring the winning goal in the 86th minute after forcing Jon Parkin's shot over the line from centimetres out. Connolly was released by York at the end of 2017–18.

Connolly signed for Scottish Championship club Dunfermline Athletic on 20 June 2018 on a one-year contract. He left the club at the end of his contract and signed for League One club Falkirk under his former Raith manager, Ray McKinnon.

International career
Connolly made one appearance for the Scotland under-16 team, against Jersey in 2010, and one for the under-19 team, against Latvia in 2013.

Career statistics

Honours
York City
FA Trophy: 2016–17

Individual
Scottish Football League Young Player of the Month: December 2012

References

External links

Profile at the Dunfermline Athletic F.C. website
Profile at the Scottish Football Association website

1995 births
Living people
Footballers from Dundee
Scottish footballers
Scotland youth international footballers
Association football wingers
Queen's Park F.C. players
Dundee United F.C. players
Brechin City F.C. players
Raith Rovers F.C. players
York City F.C. players
Dunfermline Athletic F.C. players
Scottish Football League players
Scottish Professional Football League players
National League (English football) players
People educated at Williamwood High School
Falkirk F.C. players